The 1991 Asian Judo Championships were held at Osaka, Japan on 9–10, November.

Medal overview

Men's events

Women's events

Medals table

References

Judo Channel by Token Corporation (In Japanese)

External links
 Judo Union of Asia

Asian Championships
Asian Judo Championships
International sports competitions hosted by Japan
Asian Judo Championships, 1991
Sport in Osaka
Asian Championships 1991